Eduardo Alejandro Lago Correa (born 28 June 1979 in Montevideo) is a Uruguayan former footballer. A central defender, he last played for Progreso in the Uruguayan Segunda División. He has earned league championships with both Peñarol and Rosenborg, and he was part of the Uruguay squad that came on third place in Copa América 2004.

Career
Lago has played for the Uruguay national football team and won the Uruguayan league title with his club Peñarol in 2003. Lago was bought by Rosenborg in 2005, alongside countryman Sebastián Eguren. The stay was not a success for the two players, and in January 2006 they were both loaned out to SK Brann. However, on 8 February it was announced that the transfer of both Lago and Eguren was cancelled due to "psychological reasons".

February 2006, Lago was on loan to C.A. Bella Vista (Uruguay). Later, he went back to Scandinavia, and was on loan to the Swedish club IFK Göteborg, from 1 July to 31 December 2006. The Swedish club announced that they did not want to sign Lago on a permanent basis, so he returned to Rosenborg in January 2007. After his return to Rosenborg he became more successful with 18 appearances in the 2008 season and 23 in the 2009 season.

Career statistics

Honours

Club
Peñarol
Primera División: 2003

Rosenborg BK
Norwegian Premier League Championship: 2009, 2010

Country
Copa América third place 2004

References

1979 births
Living people
Footballers from Montevideo
Uruguayan people of Galician descent
Uruguayan footballers
Uruguay international footballers
Rosenborg BK players
IFK Göteborg players
Centro Atlético Fénix players
Peñarol players
C.A. Bella Vista players
C.A. Cerro players
C.A. Progreso players
Uruguayan Primera División players
2004 Copa América players
Expatriate footballers in Norway
Expatriate footballers in Sweden
Uruguayan expatriate footballers
Allsvenskan players
Eliteserien players
Uruguayan expatriate sportspeople in Norway
Association football defenders